PKP Class ST40 is a new class of cargo diesel-electric locomotives used by the PKP LHS broad-gauge division and various Polish private operators, designated 311D (standard gauge) or 311Da (broad gauge) by its manufacturer, Newag. The class is a heavily reconstructed Russian M62 (PKP ST44), using only the underframe. The body is new, the main engine is a General Electric GE 7FDL12. Original engines were also modernised, as ED118 A GE. The class is much more economical and modern than a basic M62. The body has external walkways instead of an internal passage connecting the cabs.
The first locomotive was modernised in 2007. As of January 2009, there were 20 class 311D completed (15 for PCC Rail and five for the Baltic Railways) and six 311Da for PKP LHS, where they are designated ST40.

Specification

The locomotive is a modernisation of the popular Soviet locomotive M62 (ST44), which can be noticed by the chassis structure and carriages. The drive unit has been completely changed by installing a more efficient engine by the General Electric company which is placed in one place together with the main generator, compressor and fan. The most visible change is the complete change of the structure, the internal passageway between the cabins, having a driver's cab at each end and that the train has transitions outside with the jetties. By using the graft this has improved access to the engine. The front of the locomotive has been changed, giving a new look. The cabin has a new design and provides better working conditions.

Sources

External links
, Diesel freight locomotive 311D
, Locomotives series ST40S / 311Da
5 ft gauge locomotives
Polish State Railways diesel locomotives
Railway locomotives introduced in 2007
Standard gauge locomotives of Poland
Diesel-electric locomotives of Poland